Margarete Palz (born 1937) is a German textile artist. After studying craftmanship and art history in Saarbrücken, she taught art at a high school in Zweibrücken until 2000. She has since drawn on her creative talents, especially for designing exotic dresses which have been exhibited in Germany and beyond. For these she has received a series of awards, most recently as the winner of the 2021 Wearable Art Competition in Mandurah, Australia.

Early life
Born in 1937 in Moravská Ostrava, Czechoslovakia, Margarete Palz and her family were expelled after World War II and settled in Zweibrücken when she was 11 years old. As there was practically nothing in the shops, her maternal aunt showed her how to make her own clothes, introducing her to cloth, colour and wool. From 1957, she studied at the Saar Collage of Art and Design. She went on to study history of art at Saarland University and at the Free University of Berlin until 1961.

Career
In 1966, Palz was appointed as a high-school art teacher at the Hofenfels-Gymnasium in Zweibrücken where she remained until 2000. Her initial work was based mainly on abstract art and graphics, inspired by her instructor Oskar Hohlwech. Thanks to her brother, the photographer Gerhard Heisler, she discovered the potential of film and photographic paper, the materials she began to use for creating exotic dresses. In this connection, from 1990 she participated in "Unikater Kunstkleider" presenting visionary dance theatre clothing.

In 2006, Palz undertook a teaching assignment at the Mode Design School in Zürich. In addition to several solo exhibitions in the Saarland, Palz has exhibited in Los Angeles (2017), Berlin (2014) and Mainz (2008).

Awards
Palz has received a number of awards, including the prize for Creative Excellence, Gen-I, New Zealand (2013) and the Artist of the Year Award for her Oscillating Curves at the Wearable Art Competition, in Mandurah, Australia (2021).

References

1937 births
Living people
People from Ostrava
People from Zweibrücken
German textile artists
Women textile artists
20th-century German artists
20th-century German women artists
21st-century German artists
21st-century German women artists
Free University of Berlin alumni